Broadway Babies, aka Broadway Daddies (UK) and Ragazze d'America (Italy), is a 1929 all-talking Pre-Code black and white American musical film produced and distributed by First National Pictures, a subsidiary of Warner Brothers. The film was directed by Mervyn LeRoy and starred Alice White and Charles Delaney.  This was White's first sound film with dialogue.

Plot
Chorus girl Delight "Dee" Foster (Alice White) is in love with stage manager Billy Buvanny (Charles Delaney) and he also loves her. They plan to marry until bootlegger Perc Gessant (Fred Kohler) steps in. Dee is led to believe that Billy is in love with another girl, so she agrees to play around with Gessant when he becomes interested in her. When Gessant proposes marriage, Dee accepts. As they are about to be married, rival gangsters shoot Gessant and he ends up dying. Dee is reconciled with Billy and they become engaged.

Cast
 Alice White as Delight "Dee" Foster
 Marion Byron as Florine Chanler
 Sally Eilers as Navarre King
 Charles Delaney as Billy Buvanny
 Tom Dugan as Scotty
 Bodil Rosing as Sarah Durgan
 Maurice Black as Nick Stepanos
 Fred Kohler as Perc Gessant
 Louis Natheaux as August 'Gus' Brand
 Lew Harvey as Joe, one of the poker players (uncredited)
 Aggie Herring as Landlady (uncredited)
 Al Hill as One of Perc's henchmen (uncredited)
 Armand Kaliz as Tony Ginetti, the nightclub manager (uncredited)

Production
Broadway Babies was one of the many movie musicals with a Broadway setting that were made at the dawn of the "talkie" era.  Such films were called "backstagers", a vogue that evolved during the emergence of sound pictures and from the success of The Jazz Singer (1927) and The Singing Fool (1928), both also Warner Bros.' films.  Broadway Babies was also one of a number of similar vehicles created for Alice White; it was White's first all-sound as well as her most successful picture. The film was adapted from "Broadway Musketeers", a story by Jay Gelzer.

Songs
Three songs were written for White to perform in Broadway Babies: "Wishing and Waiting for Love" with lyrics by Grant Clarke and music by Harry Akst; "Jig, Jig, Jigaloo", lyrics by Al Bryan, music by George W. Meyer; and "Broadway Baby Dolls", also by Bryan and Meyer.  Incidental music included "Give My Regards to Broadway" (George M. Cohan), "Vesti La Giubba" (Ruggero Leoncavallo), and "Bridal Chorus (Here Comes the Bride)" (Richard Wagner).

Preservation
As was common in the era, a silent version was also prepared for theatres not yet equipped for talkies. Only the sound version survives, as a 16mm reduction positive in the Library of Congress collection, although it has been preserved and is shown occasionally on Turner Classic Movies. The film's trailer also survives incomplete.

References

External links

1929 films
1929 musical films
American black-and-white films
American musical films
1920s English-language films
Films about entertainers
Films based on short fiction
Films directed by Mervyn LeRoy
Films produced by Robert North
Films set in New York City
First National Pictures films
Warner Bros. films
1920s American films